Gianni Davito (born 19 August 1957) is a retired Italian high jumper.

Biography
He finished eighth at the 1977 European Indoor Championships. He also competed at the 1983 World Championships without reaching the final.

His personal best jump is 2.27 metres, achieved in July 1983 in Rome.

Achievements

National titles
Gianni Davito has won 6 times the individual national championship.
2 win in High jump (1983, 1986)
4 wins in High jump indoor (1984, 1986, 1990, 1991)

References

External links
 

1957 births
Living people
Italian male high jumpers
World Athletics Championships athletes for Italy